This World We Live In is a young adult science fiction novel by American author Susan Beth Pfeffer, first published in 2010 by Harcourt Books. It is the third book in The Last Survivors series, being a sequel to both The Dead and the Gone and Life as We Knew It. In was succeeded in 2013 by The Shade of the Moon, which concluded the series.

Background
In the afterword of The Shade of the Moon, Pfeffer states that she didn't intend to continue the series after The Dead and the Gone until her publisher contacted her for a sequel for the characters of both books. Early drafts of this book originally took place eighteen years after the previous two and would focus on a teenaged Gabriel struggling to make his way to Pennsylvania to reunite with his half-siblings. In the final draft, he appears as an infant.

Synopsis 
A year after a meteor knocked the moon closer to Earth, Miranda is awoken in the middle of the night by the sound of it raining for the first time in months. She and her brothers begin gathering rainwater. Worrying about the stability of their food supply, Matt and Jon decide to embark on a week-long fishing trip on the Delaware River. In preparation, the siblings raid abandoned houses, also restocking on essentials. Matt and Jon leave for their trip and Miranda and her mother Laura prepare to store the fish in the flooded cellar. They attempt to empty it out one pail at a time, but while Miranda takes a break Laura passes out in the water and nearly drowns, but Miranda pulls her out and revives her.

Jon and Matt return from their trip alongside a beautiful young woman named Syl, who Matt announces is his new wife. Jon explains that they met Syl in a deserted motel after Matt protected her from an abusive partner and that Matt and Syl exchanged marriage vows the next day. On the one-year anniversary of the moon crash, the boys have left for another fishing trip and Syl suggests making an offering to Diana. Miranda sacrifices an old trophy, Laura her first book contract, and Syl her long hair.

In June, Miranda’s father Hal suddenly arrives at the house with Lisa and their newborn son Gabriel. They are also traveling with a middle-aged man named Charlie and also Alex and Julie Morales (the main characters of The Dead and the Gone). The six of them met at an evacuation camp and began traveling together, but Alex claims he plans to go to an Ohio monastery after dropping Julie off at a convent in upstate New York (the same one he sent Briana to). The next day Miranda overhears Laura and Matt arguing about how to provide for everyone and learns that Hal and Lisa offered to take Miranda with them when they visited months ago, but that Laura refused.

In the coming days, the newcomers move into Mrs. Nesbitt’s former house next door and sign up for the food program by pretending to be her family. While Miranda and Alex are out raiding houses, they find a van with some gas and an ample food supply. As Alex prepares to leave, he and Miranda begin to bond romantically, and she privately hopes that he will stay with her if he knows Julie is safe at the convent. Alex reveals to her that he has sleeping pills in reserve to euthanize his sister if there ever comes a point when he is unable to protect Julie from a fate worse than death and killing her would be merciful.

Alex, Julie, Hal, and Miranda drive the van to the New York convent to find that all but one of the nuns have left or died. Partway through the journey back to Pennsylvania, the van dies and the four of them walk the rest of the way home. During an argument, Jon reveals that Julie told him Alex has three passes to a safe town in an unknown location that he doesn’t plan on using. While looting houses with Miranda, he admits he has given up on going to the monastery and asks her to marry him and leave for Pittsburgh with him and Julie. Miranda later questions Syl and learns about a safe town in Tennessee at the former Sexton University. Miranda goes to Alex with the information and they reveal the town’s existence to the rest of the extended family. They begin making plans for Lisa, Julie, and Gabriel to live inside the safe town while Alex, Miranda, and Hal live outside the town as part of its labor force and everyone else stays behind in Pennsylvania.

In preparation for the journey, Alex and Miranda look for abandoned bikes and she agrees to marry him in Tennessee. However, a tornado suddenly strikes and they bike home, but Alex leaves to warn Julie and Jon, who are out looking for food. At Hal and Lisa’s house, Miranda finds Alex’s passes and pills and hides in a storage closet to wait out the tornado. When it passes, Miranda is trapped but able to communicate with Lisa and Charlie as they hide in the cellar. While trapped, Charlie suffers a heart attack and dies. Eventually, Hal is able to free Miranda and she realizes the two houses have been all but destroyed as the others begin working to free Lisa and Gabriel. Jon returns and says that Julie was injured during the storm and is now paralyzed below the neck. Laura recognizes that Julie will certainly die from her injury and focuses on making her comfortable when Hal and Matt carry her home.

With Alex still missing, Miranda now sees herself as Julie’s family. While everyone else works to free Lisa, Miranda stays with Julie and they discuss heaven, saints, and Julie’s late mother. Remembering what Alex planned if death became preferable to life for Julie, Miranda gives her the sleeping pills and smothers her to death with a pillow to end her suffering. The next day, Lisa and Gabriel finally emerge from the cellar and the family mourns Julie.

After being missing for three days, Alex finally returns and is informed that Julie has passed away (everyone believing she died from her injury) and is comforted by the knowledge that she did not die alone. With their home destroyed, the rest of the family decides to go to the safe town in Tennessee with the others who’d already planned to. As everyone prepares to leave, Miranda reflects that she will eventually have to tell Alex that she killed Julie but hopes he will be able to forgive her. Miranda decides to leave her diaries behind in the house and the surviving family members leave for Tennessee together.

Characters

Miranda Evans: A 17-year-old girl who also narrated Life as We Knew It. At the start of this novel, she lives with her mother and brothers in Pennsylvania and receives weekly food deliveries.

Alex Morales: The 18-year-old protagonist of The Dead and the Gone. Since the events of that book, he briefly reunited with his brother Carlos in Texas who advised him to take Julie to the New York convent. Privately, Miranda nicknames him "the last living boy in America".

Julie Morales: Alex's 13-year-old sister who he is deeply protective of. Throughout the novel she and Jon become romantically involved.

Laura Evans: Mother of Matt, Miranda, and Jon.

Matt Evans: Miranda's older brother who was in college when the asteroid hit the moon.

Jon Evans: Miranda's 14-year-old brother.

Syl: A young woman who Matt marries after knowing for only a day. It is unclear what her life was like before meeting Matt and Syl is not her birth name, but rather she chose it after Sylvia Plath. After learning her family died, she spent some time traveling in bands around the country before splitting off with an abusive partner who she later leaves to marry Matt.

Hal Evans: Father of Matt, Miranda, and Jon and ex-husband to Laura.

Lisa Evans: Miranda's stepmother. Since she is nursing Gabriel, the rest of the family is willing to give up food for her to ensure she is healthy.

Gabriel Evans: Lisa and Hal's newborn son who was born on Christmas. In Life as We Knew It, Miranda, knowing Lisa was pregnant, imagined her baby would be a girl named Rachel.

Charlie Rutherford: A friend of Lisa and Hal who they met in an evacuation camp and began traveling with.

Reception
Kirkus Reviews gave This World We Live In a mixed review, stating that "The author once again creates an extremely satisfying blend of human drama and action. Grimly frightening imagery and spot-on depiction of day-to-day bleakness are emotionally potent", but "Given the circumstances, it is believable that their relationship would be rushed, but the initial antagonistic tone set up between them still seems too easily resolved, resulting in a formulaic feel." Publishers Weekly declared that "Pfeffer masterfully evokes the cold, colorless world in which her characters reside" where "hope is never completely extinguished". In a positive review, the website The Books Smugglers gave the book an eight out of ten rating, though noted that it wasn't as strong as its predecessors.

References

American young adult novels
American science fiction novels
Children's science fiction novels
Fictional diaries
Novels about impact events
Novels set in Pennsylvania